The  is the nickname of portions of the Tokaido Main Line and the Sanyo Main Line, between Osaka Station in Osaka, Osaka Prefecture and Himeji Station in Himeji, Hyōgo Prefecture. The line, along with the JR Kyoto Line and the Biwako Line, forms a contiguous service that is the main trunk of West Japan Railway Company's Urban Network commuter rail network in the Osaka-Kobe-Kyoto Metropolitan Area. The line also offers continuous service to the Gakkentoshi Line via the JR Tōzai Line.

Trains

  & 

  (links Osaka to Hamasaka and Tottori)
  (links Kyoto, Osaka to Tottori and Kurayoshi)

 

Continuing service from the Kyoto Line, trains stop at Osaka, Amagasaki, Ashiya, Sannomiya, Kobe, Akashi, Nishi-Akashi, Kakogawa and Himeji. Service extends beyond Himeji on Sanyo Main Line to Aboshi, Kamigori and Ako Line to Banshu-Ako.

Continuing service from the Kyoto Line, trains stop at Osaka, Amagasaki, Nishinomiya, Ashiya, Sumiyoshi, Rokkomichi, Sannomiya, Motomachi, Kobe, Hyōgo, Suma, Tarumi, Maiko and Akashi as rapid service trains and every station after Akashi as local trains. Service extends beyond Himeji on Sanyo Main Line to Aboshi, Kamigori and Ako Line to Banshu-Ako.  In the morning , the trains pass Suma, Tarumi and Maiko.

Continuing service from the Kyoto Line at Osaka and the JR Tōzai Line at Amagasaki. Makes every stop to Nishi-Akashi, with some extended service to Kakogawa during rush hour.

Stations

Stations are listed from east to west.

●: Trains stop at all times
｜: Trains pass at all times
▲: Eastbound trains pass in the morning
○:Trains stop at morning 
of Weekdays only

Rolling stock

Local

 207 series (from 1991, through service with Fukuchiyama Line and Katamachi Line via JR Tōzai Line)
 321 series (from 2005, through service with Fukuchiyama Line and Katamachi Line via JR Tōzai Line)

Special Rapid and Rapid
 221 series (from 1989, through service with Akō Line via Sanyo Line, rapid only, until 2023)
 223-1000/2000series (from 1995, through service with Akō Line via Sanyo Line)
 225-0/100 series (from 2010, through service with Akō Line via Sanyo Line)

Limited Express
 285 series (Sunrise Izumo/Sunrise Seto service from July 1998, through service with Seto-Ōhashi Line and Hakubi Line)
 289 series (Rakuraku Harima service from 18 March 2019)
 KiHa 189 series (Hamakaze service from 2010, through service with Sanin Main Line via Bantan Line)
 Chizu Express HOT7000 series (Super Hakuto service from 1994, through service with Sanin Main Line via Chizu Line)

Former
 103 series (until August 1, 2005) 
 113 series (until October 16, 2004)
 115 series
 117 series (from 1980 until May 10, 1999)
 201 series (from 1983 until 2007)
 205-0 series (from 1986 until 2006, from 2011 until March 2013)
 KiHa 181 series (Hamakaze limited express, until 2010)

See also
Hankyu Kobe Line
Biwako Line
JR Kyoto Line

References

External links

 
Transport in Kobe
Kobe Line
Kobe Line
Kobe Line
1067 mm gauge railways in Japan